Bjarki Bergmann Gunnlaugsson (born 3 March 1973 in Akranes) is a retired Icelandic professional footballer who last played for FH.

Club career 

After a period in English football at Preston North End FC, Bjarki joined up with his twin brother Arnar and they played together at KR Reykjavík when they came back home. The played with the team for several years, then joined their childhood club, ÍA Akranes, in 2006. They became the managers of the club, when the team manager, Ólafur Þórðarson, left the club because of a horrible start in the division. The brothers saved the club from relegation, but the chairman of the club hired manager Guðjón Þórðarson to control the club. Then the brothers left ÍA Akranes to join the Icelandic champions, FH Hafnarfjörður.

In July 2008, the brothers left FH amicably when Guðjón Þórðarson had been fired from ÍA, and again took the reins of their old club as player-managers.

In June 2010, it was announced that Bjarki had joined his former club and Icelandic champions FH Hafnarfjörður on free transfer. He signed a one-year contract. This transfer meant that for the first time the Gunnlaugsson twins were on opposing sides in the same league, as Arnar currently played for Fram Reykjavik.

International career 

Bjarki made his debut for Iceland in an October 1993 friendly match against Tunisia, coming on as a substitute for Arnar Grétarsson. He has been capped 27 times for Iceland, scoring seven goals. He scored in his last international match, a February 2000 friendly match against the Faroe Islands.

References

External links 

 

1973 births
Living people
Bjarki Gunnlaugsson
Bjarki Gunnlaugsson
Bjarki Gunnlaugsson
Feyenoord players
1. FC Nürnberg players
SV Waldhof Mannheim players
Molde FK players
SK Brann players
Bjarki Gunnlaugsson
Preston North End F.C. players
Bjarki Gunnlaugsson
Bjarki Gunnlaugsson
Eredivisie players
Eliteserien players
2. Bundesliga players
Bjarki Gunnlaugsson
Bjarki Gunnlaugsson
Expatriate footballers in the Netherlands
Bjarki Gunnlaugsson
Expatriate footballers in Germany
Bjarki Gunnlaugsson
Expatriate footballers in Norway
Expatriate footballers in England
Bjarki Gunnlaugsson
Twin sportspeople
Bjarki Gunnlaugsson
Bjarki Gunnlaugsson
Association football midfielders
Icelandic football managers